Hanna-Barbera was an American animation studio and production company that was active from 1957 to 2001. It was founded on July 7, 1957, by William Hanna and Joseph Barbera following the decision of Metro-Goldwyn-Mayer to close its in-house cartoon studio, headquartered on Cahuenga Boulevard from 1960 until 1998 and then at the Sherman Oaks Galleria in Sherman Oaks, both in Los Angeles, California, until going defunct. 

It produced many fully animated television shows, including Huckleberry Hound, Quick Draw McGraw, The Flintstones, Yogi Bear, The Jetsons, Jonny Quest, Wacky Races, Scooby-Doo and The Smurfs. Its cartoons have won a record-breaking eight Emmys.

The profitability of Saturday-morning cartoons was eclipsed by weekday afternoon syndication after H-B's fortunes declined by the 1980s. Taft Broadcasting acquired Hanna-Barbera in 1966 and retained ownership until 1991 when Turner Broadcasting System took over and used its back catalog as programming for its then-newly-created Cartoon Network, launched a year later. 

Turner later merged in 1996 with Time Warner, rebranded as WarnerMedia in 2018 and is now part of Warner Bros. Discovery since 2022. After Hanna died on March 22, 2001, Hanna-Barbera as a standalone company was dissolved and merged into Warner Bros. Animation and later Cartoon Network Studios. 

The branding has still been used as an imprint for selected Cartoon Network Studios involving its classic properties, while Cartoon Network Studios Europe was rebranded as Hanna-Barbera Studios Europe in 2021.

History

Tom and Jerry and birth of a studio (1937–1957) 
William Denby Hanna (Bill), native of Melrose, New Mexico and Joseph Roland Barbera (Joe), born of Italian heritage in New York City, first met at the Metro-Goldwyn-Mayer (MGM) studio in 1937, while working at its animation division. Having worked at other studios since the early 1930s, they solidified an "eight-decade" working partnership. 

Their very first success Tom and Jerry, centered around the madcap comical adventures of a cat and a mouse. Hanna supervised the animation, while Barbera did the stories and pre-production. Seven of the cartoons won 7 Oscars for Best Short Subject (Cartoons) between 1943 and 1953, and five additional shorts were nominated for 12 awards during this period. However, they were awarded to producer Fred Quimby, who was not involved in the development of the shorts. 

Sequences for Anchors Aweigh, Dangerous When Wet and Invitation to the Dance and other shorts Gallopin' Gals, The Goose Goes South, Officer Pooch, War Dogs and Good Will to Men were also made and supervised The Bear and the Bean. With Quimby's retirement in May 1955, Hanna and Barbera became the producers in charge of the MGM animation studio's output. 

In addition to continuing to write and direct new Tom & Jerry shorts, now in CinemaScope, Hanna and Barbera supervised the last seven shorts of Tex Avery's Droopy series and produced and directed the short-lived Spike and Tyke, which ran for two entries.

In addition to their work on the cartoons, the two men moonlighted on outside projects, including title sequences and commercials for I Love Lucy. MGM decided in mid-1957 to close its cartoon studio, as it felt it had acquired a reasonable backlog of shorts for re-release. While contemplating their future, Hanna and Barbera began producing additional animated television commercials. During their last year at MGM, they had developed a concept for a new animated TV program about a cat and a dog. 

After they failed to convince the studio to back their venture, live-action director George Sidney, who had worked with Hanna and Barbera on several of his theatrical features for MGM, offered to serve as their business partner and convinced Screen Gems to make a deal with the producers. A coin toss gave Hanna precedence in naming the new studio. Harry Cohn, president and head of Columbia Pictures, took an 18% ownership in their new company, H-B Enterprises, and provided working capital.

Screen Gems became the new distributor and its licensing agent, handling merchandizing of the characters from the animated programs as the cartoon firm officially opened for business in rented offices on the lot of Kling Studios (formerly Charlie Chaplin Studios) on July 7, 1957, one year after the MGM animation studio closed. 

Sidney and several Screen Gems alumni became members of the studio's board of directors and much of the former MGM animation staff—including animators Carlo Vinci, Kenneth Muse, Lewis Marshall, Michael Lah and Ed Barge and layout artists Ed Benedict and Richard Bickenbach—became the new production staff.

Hoyt Curtin was in charge of providing the music while voice performers, such as Penny Singleton, Paul Winchell, Janet Waldo, Alan Reed, Henry Corden, Jean Vander Pyl, Frank Welker, Arnold Stang, Marvin Kaplan, Allen Melvin, Bea Benaderet, June Foray, Gerry Johnson, Lucille Bliss, Casey Kasem, Gary Owens, Scatman Crothers, George O' Hanlon, Daws Butler, Don Messick, Julie Bennett, Mel Blanc, Howard Morris, John Stephenson, Hal Smith, Tim Matheson, Doug Young and Danny Goldman came on board.

Success with animated sitcoms (1957–1969) 
The Ruff and Reddy Show, its very first televised cartoon, premiered on NBC on December 14, 1957.  The Huckleberry Hound Show, which came on September 29, 1958, and aired in most markets just before prime time, was the first animated series to win an Emmy. Beginning to expand rapidly following its initial success, several animation industry alumni – in particular former Warner Bros. Cartoons storymen Michael Maltese and Warren Foster, became new head writers and joined the staff at this time, along with Joe Ruby and Ken Spears as film editors and Iwao Takamoto as character designer.

H-B Enterprises was reincorporated as Hanna-Barbera Productions, Inc. by 1959, and slowly became a leader in TV animation production from then on. The Quick Draw McGraw Show and Loopy De Loop, its only theatrical short film series, followed that same year. Around the same time, Walt Disney Productions laid off several of its animators after Sleeping Beauty (1959) bombed during its initial theatrical run, with many of them moving to Hanna-Barbera shortly afterwards. In August 1960, the company moved into a window-less, cinder block building at 3501 Cahuenga Boulevard West, though the building was too small to house the growing staff and some of its employees worked from home. 

The Flintstones premiered in prime time on ABC in 1960, loosely based on The Honeymooners and set in a fictionalized Stone Age of cavemen and dinosaurs. Jackie Gleason considered suing Hanna-Barbera for copyright infringement, but decided not to because he did not want to be known as "the man who yanked Fred Flintstone off the air". The series ran for six seasons, becoming the longest-running animated show in American prime time at the time (until The Simpsons beat it in 1997), a ratings and merchandising success and the top-ranking animated program in syndication history. It initially received mixed reviews from critics, but its reputation eventually improved and it is now considered a classic.

The Yogi Bear Show, Top Cat, Wally Gator, Touché Turtle and Dum Dum, Lippy the Lion & Hardy Har Har and The Jetsons soon followed in 1961 and 1962. Several animated TV commercials were produced as well, often starring their own characters (probably the best known is a series of Pebbles cereal commercials for Post featuring Barney tricking Fred into giving him his Pebbles cereal) and H-B also produced the opening credits for Bewitched, in which animated caricatures of Samantha and Darrin appeared. These characterizations were reused in the sixth season Flintstones episode "Samantha".

In 1963, Hanna-Barbera's operations moved to 3400 Cahuenga Boulevard West in Hollywood Hills/Studio City. This contemporary office building was designed by architect Arthur Froehlich. Its ultra-modern design included a sculpted latticework exterior, moat, fountains, and a Jetsons-like tower. In 1964 and 1965, The Magilla Gorilla Show, The Peter Potamus Show, Jonny Quest, Atom Ant, Secret Squirrel and Sinbad Jr. and his Magic Belt came on air. Screen Gems and Hanna-Barbera's partnership lasted until 1965 when Hanna and Barbera announced the sale of their studio to Taft Broadcasting.

Taft's acquisition of Hanna-Barbera was delayed for a year by a lawsuit from Joan Perry, John Cohn, and Harrison Cohn – the wife and sons of former Columbia Pictures president Harry Cohn, who felt that the studio undervalued the Cohns' 18% share in the company when it was sold a few years previously. In 1966, Laurel and Hardy, Frankenstein Jr. and The Impossibles and Space Ghost first aired and by December 1966, the litigation had been settled and the studio was finally acquired by Taft for $12 million. Taft folded the studio into its corporate structure in 1967 and 1968, becoming its distributor.

Hanna and Barbera stayed on with the studio while Screen Gems retained licensing and distribution rights to the previous Hanna-Barbera-produced cartoons, along with trademarks to the characters into the 1970s and 1980s. A number of new comedy and action cartoons followed in 1967, among them are The Space Kidettes, The Abbott and Costello Cartoon Show, Birdman and the Galaxy Trio, The Herculoids, Shazzan, Fantastic Four, Moby Dick and Mighty Mightor and Samson & Goliath.

The Banana Splits Adventure Hour, The Adventures of Gulliver, and The New Adventures of Huckleberry Finn arose in 1968, while the successful Wacky Races and its spinoffs The Perils of Penelope Pitstop and Dastardly and Muttley in Their Flying Machines aired on CBS, followed by Cattanooga Cats for ABC. The studio had a record label, Hanna-Barbera Records, headed by Danny Hutton and distributed by Columbia Records. Previously, children's records featuring Hanna-Barbera characters were released by Colpix Records.

Mysteries, spinoffs, and more (1969–1979) 
Ruby and Spears created Scooby-Doo, Where Are You! for CBS Saturday mornings in 1969, a mystery-based program which blended comedy, action, and elements from I Love a Mystery and The Many Loves of Dobie Gillis. Running for two seasons, it centered on four teenagers and a dog solving supernatural mysteries, and became one of Hanna-Barbera's most successful creations and has spawned several new spin-offs, such as The New Scooby-Doo Movies, The Scooby-Doo Show, Scooby-Doo and Scrappy-Doo and many others, which were regularly in production at Hanna-Barbera into the 1990s.

Referred to as "The General Motors of animation", Hanna-Barbera eventually went even further by producing nearly two-thirds of all Saturday-morning cartoons in a single year. Several Hanna-Barbera series from the 1970s, such as Josie and the Pussycats, The Funky Phantom, The Amazing Chan and the Chan Clan, Speed Buggy, Butch Cassidy and the Sundance Kids, Goober and the Ghost Chasers, Inch High, Private Eye, Clue Club, Jabberjaw, Captain Caveman and the Teen Angels and The New Shmoo built upon the mystery-solving template set by Scooby-Doo, with further series built around teenagers solving mysteries with a comic relief pet of some sort.

The Pebbles and Bamm-Bamm Show returned The Flintstones characters to television in 1971 with a new spin-off series based on their now teenaged children while The Flintstone Comedy Hour and The New Fred and Barney Show remained in production through the early 1980s. Meanwhile, Josie received her own spinoff [[Josie and the Pussycats (TV series)#Josie and the Pussycats in Other Space|Josie and the Pussycats in Outer Space]]. Yogi Bear, Huckleberry Hound and others returned in 1972 for brand new shows, such as Yogi's Gang, Laff-a-Lympics, Yogi's Space Race, and Galaxy Goof-Ups, while Tom and Jerry were also given a new series of televised cartoons in 1975.The Great Grape Ape Show and The Mumbly Cartoon Show followed soon after. In 1972, Hanna-Barbera opened an animation studio in Australia, with the Hamlyn Group acquiring a 50% stake in 1974. Hamlyn was acquired by James Hardie Industries. In 1988, Hanna-Barbera Australia bought itself out from Hardie and Taft Broadcasting, with the studio changing its name to Southern Star Group. The studio has since become Endemol Shine Australia, a division of Banijay. In 1973, Hanna-Barbera produced the first of several iterations of Super Friends, an action-adventure series adapted from DC Comics' Justice League of America superhero characters.

Following 1973's Super Friends on ABC, the show returned to production in 1976, remaining on ABC through 1986 with The All-New Super Friends Hour, Challenge of the Super Friends and The World's Greatest Super Friends. Other 1970s Hanna-Barbera series included Harlem Globetrotters, Wait Till Your Father Gets Home, Help!... It's the Hair Bear Bunch!, The Roman Holidays, Sealab 2020, Jeannie, The Addams Family, Hong Kong Phooey, Devlin, Partridge Family 2200 A.D., These Are The Days, Valley of the Dinosaurs, Wheelie and the Chopper Bunch, Dynomutt, Dog Wonder, CB Bears, The Robonic Stooges, The All New Popeye Hour, Godzilla, Buford and the Galloping Ghost and Jana of the Jungle.Charlotte's Web, an adaptation of E. B. White's children's novel and Hanna-Barbera's first feature film not based on one of their TV shows, was released in 1973 by Paramount Pictures. While the majority of American television animation during the second half of the 20th century was made by Hanna-Barbera, with major competition coming from Filmation and DePatie–Freleng, then-ABC president Fred Silverman gave its Saturday-morning cartoon time to them after dropping Filmation for its failure of Uncle Croc's Block. Along with the rest of the American animation industry, it began moving away from producing all its cartoons in-house in the late 1970s and early 1980s.

Ruby and Spears worked with Hanna-Barbera in 1976 and 1977 as ABC network executives to create and develop new cartoons before leaving in 1977 to start their company, Ruby-Spears Enterprises, with Filmways as its parent division. In 1979, Taft bought Worldvision Enterprises, which became Hanna-Barbera's distributor. New live-action material was produced in the 1970s and early 1980s, as well as new live-action/animated projects since the mid-1960s. Their live-action unit spun off and became Solow Production Company in 1976.

 Control decrease and Smurfs-era (1980–1991) Super Friends, Scooby-Doo and Scrappy-Doo, The Fonz and the Happy Days Gang, Richie Rich, The Flintstone Comedy Show, Laverne and Shirley in the Army, Space Stars, The Kwicky Koala Show and Trollkins debuted in 1980 and 1981. Taft purchased Ruby-Spears from Filmways (which was eventually absorbed into Orion the following year), making it a sister studio to Hanna-Barbera. As a result, several early-1980s series were shared between both studios, the animated version of Mork & Mindy and The Scooby & Scrappy-Doo/Puppy Hour among them. 

Other of Hollywood's animation factories such as Filmation, Sunbow Entertainment, Marvel Productions, Rankin/Bass, DIC and Saban Entertainment introduced successful syndicated shows based on licensed properties. While Hanna-Barbera continued to produce for Saturday mornings and weekday afternoons, it no longer dominated the TV animation market and its control over children's programming went down from 80% to 20%.The Smurfs, adapted from the Belgian comic of the same name by Pierre Culliford (known as Peyo) and centering on a group of tiny blue creatures led by Papa Smurf, premiered on NBC and aired for nine seasons, becoming the longest-running Saturday-morning cartoon series in broadcast history, a significant ratings success, the top-rated program in eight years and the highest for an NBC show since 1970. Jokebook, The Gary Coleman Show, Shirt Tales, Pac-Man, The Little Rascals, The Dukes, Monchhichis, The New Scooby and Scrappy-Doo Show and The Biskitts were aired in 1982 and 1983.

Following an animation strike in 1982, more of Hanna and Barbera's shows were outsourced to studios outside of the United States. Cuckoo's Nest Studios, Mr. Big Cartoons, Toei Animation and Fil-Cartoons in Australia and Asia provided production services to Hanna-Barbera from 1982 through to the end of its existence. The New Scooby-Doo Mysteries, Snorks, Challenge of the GoBots, Pink Panther and Sons, Super Friends: The Legendary Super Powers Show, The Super Powers Team: Galactic Guardians, The 13 Ghosts of Scooby-Doo, Yogi's Treasure Hunt, Galtar and the Golden Lance, Paw Paws and new episodes of The Jetsons premiered in 1984 and 1985.The Greatest Adventure: Stories from the Bible, new episodes of Jonny Quest, Pound Puppies, The Flintstone Kids, Foofur, Wildfire, Sky Commanders and Popeye and Son made their 1986 and 1987 premieres. Taft's financial troubles were affecting Hanna-Barbera, leading to its acquirement by the American Financial Corporation in 1987 and renamed to Great American Broadcasting the next year. A Pup Named Scooby-Doo, The Completely Mental Misadventures of Ed Grimley, new episodes of Yogi Bear, Fantastic Max, The Further Adventures of SuperTed and Paddington Bear followed in 1988 and 1989.

Great American sold Worldvision to Aaron Spelling Productions, while Hanna-Barbera and its library remained with them. In January 1989, while working on A Pup Named Scooby-Doo, Tom Ruegger got a call from Warner Bros. to resurrect its animation department. Ruegger, along with several of his colleagues, left Hanna-Barbera at that time to develop new programs such as Tiny Toon Adventures and Animaniacs at Warner Bros. David Kirschner, known for An American Tail and Child's Play, was later appointed as the new CEO of Hanna-Barbera.

In 1990, while Kirschner and the studio formed Bedrock Productions,  Great American put Hanna-Barbera and Ruby-Spears, up for sale after being less successful and burdened in debt. New shows Midnight Patrol: Adventures in the Dream Zone, Rick Moranis in Gravedale High, Tom & Jerry Kids, Bill and Ted's Excellent Adventures, The Adventures of Don Coyote and Sancho Panda and Wake, Rattle, and Roll first aired that year. Young Robin Hood, The Pirates of Dark Water and Yo Yogi! would follow in 1991.

 Acquisition by Turner and absorption into Warner Bros. Animation (1991–2001) 
Turner Broadcasting System outbid MCA (then-parent company of Universal Pictures), Hallmark Cards and other major companies in acquiring Hanna-Barbera while also purchasing Ruby-Spears as well. The two studios were acquired in a 50-50 joint venture between Turner Broadcasting System and Apollo Investment Fund for $320 million. Turner purchased these assets to launch a then-new all-animation network aimed at children and younger audiences which would be called Cartoon Network.

Scott Sassa hired Fred Seibert to head Hanna-Barbera, who filled the gap left by Great American's production crew with new animators, directors, producers and writers, including Craig McCracken, Donovan Cook, Genndy Tartakovsky, David Feiss, Seth MacFarlane, Van Partible and Butch Hartman. Following its new name H-B Production Company and Fish Police, Capitol Critters and new episodes of The Addams Family for broadcast, Cartoon Network launched in 1992 and became the first 24-hour all-animation channel, to air its library of cartoon classics, of which Hanna-Barbera was the core contributor. 

In 1993, the studio again renamed itself to Hanna-Barbera Cartoons, Inc. (though the Hanna-Barbera Productions name was still used in regards to the pre-1992 properties) and while Turner acquired its remaining interests from Apollo Investment Fund for $255 million, Droopy, Master Detective, The New Adventures of Captain Planet, SWAT Kats: The Radical Squadron and 2 Stupid Dogs emerged that year. 

Turner refocused the studio to produce new shows exclusively for its networks. In 1995, while Bruce Johnson left H-B to start up PorchLight Entertainment, ABC aired Dumb and Dumber while Seibert launched What a Cartoon! for Cartoon Network. During 1996, Dexter's Laboratory, The Real Adventures of Jonny Quest and Cave Kids premiered while Turner merged with Time Warner (then WarnerMedia, now Warner Bros. Discovery). Johnny Bravo, Cow and Chicken and The Powerpuff Girls made their debuts in 1997 and 1998.

After 35 years of being headquartered at Cahuenga Boulevard since 1963, Hanna-Barbera moved to Sherman Oaks Galleria in Sherman Oaks, California where Warner Bros. Animation was located and operated alongside it until its absorption in 2001. Cartoon Network Studios, led by former DiC and Nickelodeon production executives Brian A. Miller and Jennifer Pelphrey, was revived and took over production of programming, after moving to an abandoned telephone exchange in Burbank. 

Hanna died on March 22, 2001, at the age of 90 years old. The Cahuenga Blvd. studio faced demolition after many of the Hanna-Barbera staff and performers vacated the facilities in 1997, despite the efforts of Barbera and the others to preserve it. In May 2004, the Los Angeles City Council approved a plan to preserve the headquarters, while allowing retail and residential development on the site.

 Succession and legacy-based properties (2001–present) 

Barbera continued to be involved in the production of new Hanna-Barbera material until his death on December 18, 2006 at the age of 95 years old. Warner Bros. Animation continues to produce new productions based on the legacy properties of Hanna-Barbera since then.

Warner Bros. has released several theatrical films based on Hanna-Barbera properties since 2002. Most recently, Scoob! came out on May 15, 2020, which is intended to be the first installment of a Hanna-Barbera cinematic universe. Warner Animation Group also has an animated The Jetsons film, an animated The Flintstones film and an animated Wacky Races film in development, along with more new content.

On April 7, 2021, Cartoon Network Studios Europe rebranded as Hanna-Barbera Studios Europe.  

 Production 
 Production process changes 
The small budgets that television animation producers had to work within prevented Hanna-Barbera from working with the full theatrical-quality animation that Hanna and Barbera had been known for at Metro-Goldwyn-Mayer. While the budget for MGM's seven-minute Tom and Jerry shorts was about $35,000, the Hanna-Barbera studios were required to produce five-minute Ruff and Reddy episodes for no more than $3,000 apiece. To keep within these tighter budgets, Hanna-Barbera furthered the concept of limited animation (also called "planned animation") practiced and popularized by the United Productions of America (UPA) studio, which also once had a partnership with Columbia Pictures. Character designs were simplified, and backgrounds and animation cycles (walks, runs, etc.) were regularly re-purposed.

Characters were often broken up into a handful of levels so that only the parts of the body that needed to be moved at a given time (i.e. a mouth, an arm, a head) were animated. The rest of the figure remained on a held animation cel. This allowed a typical seven-minute short to be done with only nearly 2,000 drawings instead of the usual 14,000. Dialogue, music, and sound effects were emphasized over action, leading Chuck Jones—a contemporary who worked for Warner Bros. Cartoons and whose short The Dover Boys practically invented many of the concepts in limited animation—to disparagingly refer to the limited television cartoons produced by Hanna-Barbera and others as "illustrated radio".

In a story published by The Saturday Evening Post in 1961, critics stated that Hanna-Barbera was taking on more work than it could handle and was resorting to shortcuts only a television audience would tolerate. An executive who worked for Walt Disney Productions said, "We don't even consider [them] competition". Animation historian Christopher P. Lehman argues that Hanna-Barbera attempted to maximize their bottom line by recycling story formulas and characterization instead of introducing new ones. Once a formula for an original series was deemed successful, the studio reused it in subsequent series. Besides copying their own works, Hanna-Barbera drew inspiration from the works of other people and studios.

Lehman considers that the studio served as the main example of how animation studios that focused on TV animation differed from those that focused on theatrical animation. Theatrical animation studios tried to maintain full and fluid animation and consequently struggled with the rising expenses associated with producing it. Limited animation as practiced by Hanna-Barbera kept production costs at a minimum. The cost in quality of using this technique was that Hanna-Barbera's characters only moved when necessary.

Its solution to the criticism over its quality was to go into films. It produced six theatrical feature films, among them are higher-quality versions of its television cartoons and adaptations of other material. It was also one of the first animation studios to have their work produced overseas. One of these companies was a subsidiary began by Hanna-Barbera in November 1987 called Fil-Cartoons in the Philippines, with Jerry Smith as a consultant for the subsidiary. Wang Film Productions got its start as an overseas facility for the studio in 1978.

 Digital innovation 
Hanna-Barbera was among the first animation studios to incorporate digital tools into their pipeline. As early as the 1970s, they experimented with using Scanimate, a video synthesizer, to create an early form of digital cutout style or Flash animation. A clip of artists using the machine to manipulate scanned images of Scooby-Doo characters, scaling and warping the artwork to simulate animation, is available at the Internet Archive. 

Likewise, Hanna-Barbera was perhaps the first proponent of digital ink and paint, a process wherein animators' drawings were scanned into computers and colored using software. Led by Marc Levoy, Hanna-Barbera began developing a computerized digital ink and paint system in 1979 to  help bypass much of the time-consuming labor of painting and photographing cels. The process was implemented on a third of Hanna-Barbera's animated programs, televised feature films and specials from 1984 through 1996.

 Sound effects 
Hanna-Barbera was known for its large library of sound effects, which have been featured in exhibitions at the Norman Rockwell Museum.

 Ownership 
After Hanna-Barbera's partnership with Screen Gems ended in 1966, it was sold to Taft Broadcasting where it remained its owner until 1991 when Turner Broadcasting System acquired the studio and its library for its flagship network, Cartoon Network. In 1996, Turner merged with Time Warner, then WarnerMedia, now Warner Bros. Discovery. The studio was separated from Cartoon Network Studios and absorbed into Warner Bros. Animation in 2001. Since its closure, Hanna-Barbera became an in-name-only unit of Warner Bros. and it has continued to produce new material and programming based on its classic intellectual property and the classic Hanna-Barbera logo occasionally appears. 

In 1998, the rights to Hanna-Barbera's productions for Cartoon Network (excluding The Real Adventures of Jonny Quest) were transferred to the latter entity; Cartoon Network claimed ownership of later Hanna-Barbera co-productions beginning with Cow & Chickens third season.

 Filmography 

 See also 

 List of Hanna-Barbera characters
 Boomerang
 List of films based on Hanna-Barbera cartoons
 List of Hanna-Barbera-based video games
 Hanna-Barbera in amusement parks
 Hanna-Barbera Classics Collection
 Golden age of American animation
 Animation in the United States in the television era
 Laugh track
 List of animation studios owned by Warner Bros. Discovery

 References NotesBibliography'''
 
 
 
 
 Lawrence, Guy (2006). Yogi Bear's Nuggets: A Hanna-Barbera 45 Guide. Spectropop.com.

External links 
 
 The Big Cartoon Database: Hanna-Barbera Studios Directory
 

Hanna-Barbera
1957 establishments in California
2001 disestablishments in California
1966 mergers and acquisitions
1987 mergers and acquisitions
1991 mergers and acquisitions
1996 mergers and acquisitions
American animation studios
American companies disestablished in 2001
American companies established in 1957
Annie Award winners
Companies based in Los Angeles
Entertainment companies based in California
Entertainment companies disestablished in 2001
Entertainment companies established in 1957
Film production companies of the United States
Filmmaking duos
Mass media companies disestablished in 2001
Mass media companies established in 1957
Taft Broadcasting
Turner Broadcasting System
Television production companies of the United States
Warner Bros.
Warner Bros. Discovery